Clausirion is a genus of beetles in the family Cerambycidae, containing the following species:

 Clausirion bicolor Galileo & Martins, 2000
 Clausirion comptum Martins & Napp, 1984

References

Elaphidiini